Sport/Comic Relief Does Glee Club is a British television programme aired on BBC One and CBBC. Presented by Sam & Mark and Naomi Wilkinson, the first contest aired between 14 and 18 March 2011, and was won by Soulmates. The second series was aired between 12 and 23 March 2012, and was won by The Real Deal. The third series aired between 4 and 15 March 2013 and was won by Resonate. The fourth series was aired between 10 and 21 March 2014 and was won by Musicality.

Format

Series 1 
In the first series, the glee clubs had to perform songs in different categories. There were three heats, a semi-final and a final.

Series 2 
In the second series there were eight heats. In the first round the three groups took turns to perform part of the same song as an ensemble (but all on the stage at the same time) with points being deducted for any featured vocals. The second round featured the groups taking it in turns to perform a song of their choice, but this time allowing solo/featured vocals with points being awarded. The final round saw the glee clubs taking to the stage individually and performing their "survival song".

Series 3– 
The third series onwards carried largely the same format as the first two series. There were five heats as opposed to eight, and there were only two rounds (with the second round featured in the second round scrapped). The third series onwards showed the selection process for the heats. Guest judges were also featured in this segment.

Throughout the heats, the judges score the clubs on vocal ability, creativity and performance and their combined score all together determined who wins the heat. The top 5 ranked groups out of all the heats were chosen to go to the live semifinals - whether or not the groups won the heat. The heat winners are awarded with medals. Promotional clips for Sport/Comic Relief are often shown in between each segment as the judges are verifying the scores. In earlier series (series 1 and 2), the total is out of 270, 90 points awarded for each round. Since the third series, a total of 240 points are up for grabs, 120 per round.

The live semifinals featured a phone vote, allowing viewers to vote for their favorite group; however, the judges still scored the glee clubs in the event of a tiebreak. The semi finals consisted of one performance from the glee clubs. The top three groups were put through to the final, where the same rules applied. It usually consisted of a guest performance.

The show is filmed at the BBC Scotland studios. Initial auditions take place in Glasgow, Manchester, London, Belfast, Birmingham, Bristol and Newcastle in front of vocal coach John Modi. These initial auditions are often featured but not fully televised. The top 24 glee clubs are picked by Modi to progress in the competition.

Judges and presenters 
Carrie Grant, David Grant, and Sisco Gomez served as judges for the first two series. The judges' auditions in the third series featured Carrie and David Grant, vocal coach John Modi (who also took part in the heats from the third series) and guest judges Dionne Bromfield, Stacey Solomon, and Joe McElderry. Gomez did not feature in the judges' auditions for the third series, but joined the Grants and Modi from the heats onwards. The fourth series featured Bromfield, Kerry Ellis and Erin Boag as guest judges for the judges auditions.

The show was presented solely by Sam & Mark for the first two series. Naomi Wilkinson presented the judges' auditions for the third series and served as backstage presenter for the studio shows while Sam & Mark presented the main show.

Comic Relief Does Glee Club (series 1 - 2011)

Reception

Sport Relief Does Glee Club (series 2 - 2012)

Reception

Comic Relief Does Glee Club (Series 3 - 2013)

Judges' auditions 
The guest judges for the judges' auditions were Dionne Bromfield, Joe McElderry, and Stacey Solomon.

Show 1

Show 2

Show 3

Studio Heats

Heat one

Heat two

Heat three

Heat four

Heat five

Semi-final

 Performance: Nina Nesbitt – "Stay Out"

Final 

 Performance: Alexandra Burke – "Elephant"

Reception

Sport Relief Does Glee Club (Series 4 - 2014)

Judges' auditions 
The guest judges for the judges' auditions were Dionne Bromfield, Kerry Ellis and Erin Boag.

Show one

Show two

Show three 

 Tenacity were unable to progress to the heats, so Unity 7 took their place.

Studio Heats

Heat one

Heat two

Heat three

Heat four

Heat five 

 Score after round 1.

Semi-final

 Performance: Foxes – "Let Go for Tonight"

Final 

 Performance: Neon Jungle – "Welcome to the Jungle"

Footnotes

References 

2011 British television series debuts
2014 British television series endings
BBC Television shows
Charity fundraisers
Comic Relief
English-language television shows
Sport Relief